Piazza Scanderbeg is a square in Rome, Italy located on the junction of Vicolo Scanderbeg and Via della Panetteria. It is named after the Albanian national hero Skanderbeg, who once lived in Palazzo Skanderbeg located on the square.

It was inaugurated by Benito Mussolini.

References

Scanderbeg
Albania–Italy relations
Rome R. II Trevi